West Marton is a village in the Craven district of North Yorkshire, England.

History
Marton is mentioned in the Domesday Book as belonging to Gospatric (son of Arnketil) and having two villagers. Historical forms of the name have been recorded as Martun, Marton in Craven, and Bothe Martons. The name derives from the Old English of mere tūn, a farm near a pool. Sometime in the 12th century, the mill at Marton was donated to the religious house of Bolton Priory, (Embsay) before it moved to the place now known as Bolton Abbey.

West Marton has a village Hall and a shop which doubles up as a post office. To the south of the village is Gledstone Hall, which is a grade II* listed building. The current building, designed by Edwin Lutyens, was built in 1923, replacing an earlier structure designed by John Carr of York.

Together with East Marton it forms the civil parish of Martons Both. At the 2011 Census, the parish of Martons Both had 213 residents.

References

External links

Villages in North Yorkshire